GNOME Commander is a 'two panel' graphical file manager for GNOME. It is built using the GTK+ toolkit and GVfs.

Features 
 GNOME MIME types
 Network support through FTP, SFTP, SAMBA and WebDAV
 Context menu with bound the right click of mouse
 User defined context menu
 Quick device access buttons with automatic mounting and unmounting
 Latest accessed folder history
 Folder bookmarks
 Plugin support
 Python scripting
 Fast file viewer for text and images
 Meta data support for Exif, IPTC, ID3, Vorbis, FLAC, APE, PDF, OLE2 and ODF tags
 Tools for advanced renaming of files, searching, quick file name search in current directory, symlinking, comparing directories.
 User defined keyboard shortcuts
 Integrated command line

User interface 
The Gnome Commander is one of the file managers with two separate panels, based on the split-view interface of Norton Commander. This allows the simultaneous view of a source and destination directory for copying and moving files or directories. This also makes comparing directories very convenient. The number of windows on the desktop is thereby reduced. In Gnome Commander the two panels can be arranged either horizontally or vertically.

The Gnome Commander is seamlessly integrated into the Gnome desktop environment and can therefore serve as an alternative to the default file manager Nautilus which offers a so-called spatial view, where the content of each directory is displayed in a new window.

Only the keyboard is required to work with Gnome Commander, which makes working processes much faster. Using the mouse is still an option. Keyboard shortcuts and the behavior of certain mouse buttons are freely configurable.

Since Gnome Commander supports GVfs, allowing access to network interfaces such as FTP, SMB, WebDAV and SSH. There is a bookmark system for folders and a built-in file viewer for text and image documents. An integrated command line enables commands directly as input to a terminal.

The integrated Archive Manager plugin supports numerous data compression file formats such as ZIP files. Furthermore, a support for metadata systems such as Exif, IPTC and ID3-Tags for audio and video files, and other documents (e.g. pdf) is integrated. This metadata can be used for example by means of an extended tool for renaming files. It is possible to define actions depending on certain file extensions and to start these actions via a pop-up menu by right-clicking on the file.

Platforms 
GNOME Commander is developed for the Linux platform. Packages are available for several Linux distributions.

See also 

 Comparison of file managers

Notes

External links
 
 GNOME Commander sources at ftp.gnome.org
 Debian packages
 Ubuntu packages
 Mandriva packages
 SuSe packages
 Fedora packages
 Gentoo ebuild for GNOME Commander

Orthodox file managers
Free file managers
GNOME Applications
File managers that use GTK